Mount Guajara is a  high mountain on Tenerife, in the Canary Islands.

Mount Guajara along with the entire Island of Tenerife is dormant volcano which has a large crater close to its summit which is accessible by road, the last leg to the summit at the northern end which is its highest point can be reached from a trail head within the crater. There is also an astronomical observatory located along a ridge at the eastern end of the crater.

Climbing routes
There are several different routes from the north and from the south. For the north access the most convenient starting point is at the hotel Parador. Roads access the Parador from four different sides of the island, and there is bus service both from the north and from the south. The hike to the summit from the hotel takes up to two hours. 

The hike from the south the Vilaflor village to the summit takes at least four to five hours. This is a considerably more difficult route due to the lower starting point which is at around 1400 meters above the sea level.

There are no restrictions or permits for climbing Guajara.

See also 
 Pico Viejo
Teide

External links

 From Vilaflor to Guajara - route description on  Mountains for Everybody.
 Guajara from Parador - description of routes on  Mountains for Everybody.

Mountains of the Canary Islands
Tenerife